The Georgia Department of Defense is a state agency charged with coordinating and supervising all agencies and functions of the Georgia National Guard. Headquartered at Clay National Guard Center in Marietta, Georgia, the Georgia Department of Defense includes the Georgia Army National Guard, the Georgia Air National Guard, and the Georgia State Defense Force.

The Georgia Department of Defense provides ready and relevant military forces to the Combatant Commanders, and with the consent of the Governor provides command and control and capabilities to support Homeland Defense and Defense Support of Civil Authorities.

Organization
The Georgia Department of Defense employs over 11,100 Army National Guard soldiers, 2,800 Air National Guard airmen, 760 State Defense Force members, and 563 state employees. It oversees the Georgia National Guard as part of the total force policy and trains its units to fight and to win on battlefields with modern technology and weaponry.

Georgia Army National Guard

The Georgia Army National Guard consists of more than 11,100 citizen-soldiers training in more than 79 hometown armories and regional facilities across the state. Georgia’s Army Guard is the 8th largest in the nation and includes combat, combat support and combat service support units. The Georgia Army National Guard is organized into five major subordinate commands: the 48th Infantry Brigade Combat Team of Macon; the 78th Homeland Response Force at Clay National Guard Center in Marietta; the 78th Aviation Troop Command also at Clay; the 560th Battlefield Surveillance Brigade at Fort Gillem; and the 648th Maneuver Enhancement Brigade in Columbus at Fort Benning.

In 2009, the Georgia Army National Guard deployed more than 3,200 soldiers in support of Operation Iraqi Freedom and Operation Enduring Freedom. Since September 11, 2001, more than 12,000 citizen-soldiers from every deployable line unit in the Georgia Army National Guard have seen federal service in support of Overseas Contingency Operations, often with multiple rotations.

Georgia Air National Guard

The Georgia Air National Guard is the air force militia of the state of Georgia. It is, along with the Georgia Army National Guard, an element of the Georgia National Guard. It is also considered a part of the United States Air Force. It has 3,000 airmen and officers assigned to the two flying wings and seven geographically separated units (GSUs) throughout Georgia, including the 165th Airlift Wing at Savannah International Airport; the 116th Air Control Wing at Robins Air Force Base; the 117th Air Control Squadron of Savannah; the 165th Air Support Operations Squadron of Brunswick, Georgia; the 224th Joint Communications Support Squadron also of Brunswick; the 283rd Combat Communications Squadron at Dobbins Air Force Base in Marietta; the 139th Intelligence Squadron at Fort Gordon; the 202nd Engineering Installation Squadron of Macon; and the 530th Air Force Band at Dobbins Air Force Base in Marietta.

All units of the Georgia Air National Guard play an active role in supporting Georgia's homeland defense posture, providing airlift, engineering and communications resources and abilities. Air Guard personnel train regularly with the Georgia Army Guard's 78th Homeland Response Force and have responsibilities with Georgia's 4th Civil Support Team, as well as the Chemical, Biological, Radiological/Nuclear, and Explosive (CBRNE)- Enhanced Response Force Package (CERFP) organization.

Georgia State Defense Force

The Georgia State Defense Force is a volunteer military unit of the Georgia Department of Defense, serving in support of the national and state constitutions under direction of the governor and the adjutant general of Georgia. Members of the Georgia State Defense Force serve alongside the Georgia Army National Guard and the Georgia Air National Guard.

The GSDF's members help support and augment the Georgia National Guard, provide professional skills to the Georgia Department of Defense, and assist Georgia communities. Volunteers are trained to assist the National Guard, provide search and rescue, medical support, and disaster relief. In 2018, the GSDF established the OPFOR Battalion. The purpose of this unit is to provide Opposing Force training to National Guard units that are preparing to deploy.

Programs and Missions

Defense Support Civil Authorities
It is a primary mission of the Georgia National Guard to stand by to assist the state or nation in matters of homeland security or natural disasters. This includes anything from fighting wild fires, helping with oil spills, helping flood victims, and assisting with riot control. The Guard has also been fighting drug violence throughout the state of Georgia, with the Georgia Department of Defense having an entire unit dedicated to Counter-drug efforts. In 2009, the Counterdrug Task Force supported more than 450 missions, which resulted in seizures of illegal narcotics with a street value of more than $251.7 million.

The Joint Staff, through the JFHQ, provides a community-based response force that offers support in defense of the state, region, and country. the Joint Staff enhances mission performance and strengthens the care provided to Georgia Department of Defense members and their families by leveraging community presence, employer support, and family care programs.

Under the JFHQ umbrella, the Georgia Department of Defense maintains liaison with the Georgia Office of Homeland Security and the Georgia Emergency Management Agency, along with key emergency and law enforcement officials across the state.

The Guard's Quick Reaction Force (QRF) provides force protection and security for WMD Civil Support Teams and CBRNE Enhanced Response Force Package Teams. The QRF comprises 132 personnel who are capable of responding within eight hours, and 500 personnel who can respond within 24 hours.

Youth ChalleNGe Academy

The Georgia National Guard runs the state and federally funded Youth ChalleNGe Academy (YCA) program. The stated purpose of the Youth ChalleNGe Academy is to provide "at-risk" youth with academic and life skills training aimed at improving employment potential and creating productive citizens. Each young person that enrolls is matched with a qualified mentor who follows the student during the residential phase and then formally assists and monitors their success during the 12 months following graduation.

The Georgia Department of Defense orchestrates two campuses; one at Fort Gordon in the Brems Barracks on Fort Gordon, near Augusta, and one at Fort Stewart near Savannah. A third campus in Milledgeville was closed in 2020. They service students from around Georgia and accept applications year round. Classes begin four times each year (two at each campus), and are continuous for  months. Following the residential phase of the program, the students must complete the 12 month post-residential phase in order to successfully complete the Youth ChalleNGe Program. The Fort Gordon Youth ChalleNGe Academy graduates approximately 425 students each year.

Students completing the program successfully can be awarded two separate diplomas: first, the Youth ChalleNGe Academy Diploma, and second, either the General Equivalency Diploma or the State of Georgia high school diploma.

STARBASE

The Georgia Department of Defense's Science and Technology Academies Reinforcing Basic Aviation and Space Education (STARBASE) program seeks to build interest in science, technology, engineering and math amongst Georgia's at-risk youth. The program exposes students and their teachers to real-world applications of math and science, through experiential learning, simulations and experiments in aviation and space-related fields.

Georgia's STARBASE serves approximately 800 fifth graders annually, with quantifiable improvement. Before participation in the program, students averaged 53% on a standardized science, technology, and math test. After participating in Georgia's STARBASE, average student scores improved by over 20 percentage points to 76.9%.

At STARBASE, students interact with military personnel to explore careers and make connections with the real world. The program provides students with 20–25 hours of experience, exposing youth to the technological environments found within the Georgia National Guard.

Financial impact

Georgia continues to support its Department of Defense's growth, with the new $26 million Cumming regional armory and the $16 million Lorenzo-Benn facility.

The Cumming armory is the first new armory in Georgia in many years. The Georgia Department of Defense also acquired Clay National Guard Center from the Navy, where a new $30 million JFHQ building is under construction, the Fort Benning joint use armory, AASF 2 being renovated to house its parachute rigger company, and a new Language Lab. There has been $300 million in renovation and construction over the last ten years, after seeing virtually none over the course of the previous forty.

The state’s investments in its national guard has had a significant positive impact on the State's economy. Because most of the organization’s funds come from federal sources, Georgia actually sees more tax revenue from the income of its citizen-soldiers than it spends on the Georgia Guard as a whole. The Georgia National Guard is provided about $10 million in state funding annually.

Georgia's Adjutant General Lineage

The Adjutant General is the senior military officer and de facto commander of the Georgia National Guard. Also known as TAG, they are subordinated to the Governor, the Chief Executive. As of today, there have been 37 Adjutant Generals in Georgia and the position has changed hands 42 times.

References

External links
 
 Georgia National Guard Facebook Page
 The Professional Guardsman Blog
 Official Flickr Page
 Georgia Guard Twitter Page
 Georgia Guard Youtube Channel
 Historical Society of the Georgia National Guard
 Georgia Department of Defense 2010 Annual Report
 Georgia Department of Defense About Us
 Fort Gordon Youth Challenge Academy
 Fort Stewart Youth Challenge Academy
 Georgia Guard works with Georgia nation
 Georgia becomes an unlikely U.S. ally in Iraq
 STARBASE
 Georgia State Defense Force
 Fort Stewart YCA Website
 Fort Gordon YCA Website

Military in Georgia (U.S. state)